Simon Kenton High School is located at 11132 Madison Pike in Independence, Kentucky. The school's mascot is the Pioneers.

History

On June 19, 1935, an application was filed with the Public Works Administration for Kenton County, Kentucky for funds to construct a public high school.  The application was approved, and on November 2, 1935, a deed was signed for a  site on Madison Pike, one-half mile south of the center of the city of Independence.  A  addition was added shortly thereafter to allow for the construction of a lake on-site to provide water for the school.  The overall project's cost is recorded as $175,606.85.

The decision to name the school after famous Kentucky pioneer Simon Kenton, was made official on October 22, 1936, with the official dedication occurring September 5 of the same year.  With an initial enrollment of 496 students, Simon Kenton High School opened its doors on September 13, 1937.

The principal is Mr. Craig Reinhart.

References

External links
School Web Page

Public high schools in Kentucky
Educational institutions established in 1937
Schools in Kenton County, Kentucky
1937 establishments in Kentucky